Jérémie Maurouard (born 23 September 1992) is a French professional rugby union player. Since 2018, his regular playing position is as hooker for Lyon OU.

References

External links
Ligue Nationale de Rugby Profile
European Professional Club Rugby Profile
Racing Metro Profile

Living people
1992 births
French rugby union players
Rugby union hookers